The 1948 Vermont gubernatorial election took place on November 2, 1948. Incumbent Republican Ernest W. Gibson Jr. ran successfully for re-election to a second term as Governor of Vermont, defeating Democratic candidate Charles F. Ryan.

Republican primary

Results

Democratic primary

Results

General election

Candidates
Ernest W. Gibson Jr. (Republican), incumbent Governor of Vermont
Charles F. Ryan (Democratic)

Results

References

Vermont
1948
Gubernatorial
November 1948 events in the United States